Serge Riaboukine (born 29 December 1957) is a French actor.

Theatre

Filmography

References

External links

1957 births
Living people
French male film actors
French male television actors
French people of Russian descent
20th-century French male actors
21st-century French male actors
People from Givors